GEO International High School (often referred to as, GIHS) is a 4-year high school in Bowling Green, Warren County, in the U.S. state of Kentucky. It is one of five high schools serving the Warren County Public Schools system.

History 
GEO International High School was established in 2016. The school was located at the site of Warren Central High School in the annex building.  With the school's population rising to over 180 students by 2016, it became the newest alternative (A-5) high school in Warren County. The original building was built during the 1970s and has undergone improvements and renovations. 
The school is a voluntary program that serves English Language Learners within the Warren County Public Schools district. The teachers at GIHS combine content (math, science, social studies, and English language arts) and language acquisition standards to form a unique curriculum that bridges language barriers and allows students to succeed.

Clubs and organizations 
GIHS has a variety of both academic and non-academic clubs and organizations. Some of these organizations include local chapters of national organizations like National Beta Club, Share Your Voice, and Student Voice. They always have GEO Integrity Talks, which is like a TED Talks. SYV members help other students to edit their outline or the speech before they give a speech. This group was formed by the Communication 145 class in 2016.

As for the soccer club, they won their first ever match 6 - 0 in 2017. The soccer team won the Owensboro United Spring Cup in 2018 in addition to finishing Runner-Up in state in 2017 at the Kentucky American Cup. In 2018, a second soccer team was created. The original team, GEO United, and the new team, GEO FC. GEO FC finished runner up in the SKY Soccer Recreational Tournament in 2018.

References

External links 
 Official GIHS Website
 GEO Integrity Talks

Schools in Warren County, Kentucky
Public high schools in Kentucky
Buildings and structures in Bowling Green, Kentucky
Educational institutions established in 2016
2016 establishments in Kentucky